Kateh Sar-e Khomam Rural District is a rural district (dehestan) in Khomam District, Rasht County, Gilan Province, Iran. At the 2006 census, its population was 11,757, in 3,416 families. The rural district has 12 villages.

References 

Rural Districts of Gilan Province
Rasht County